In mathematics, a filter or order filter is a special subset of a partially ordered set (poset). Filters appear in order and lattice theory, but can also be found in topology, from which they originate. The dual notion of a filter is an order ideal.

Filters on sets were introduced by Henri Cartan in 1937 and as described in the article dedicated to filters in topology, they were subsequently used by Nicolas Bourbaki in their book Topologie Générale as an alternative to the related notion of a net developed in 1922 by E. H. Moore and Herman L. Smith. Order filters are generalizations of this notion from sets to the more general setting of partially ordered sets. For information on order filters in the special case where the poset consists of the power set ordered by set inclusion, see the article Filter (set theory).

Motivation

1. Intuitively, a filter in a partially ordered set,  is a subset of  that includes as members those elements that are large enough to satisfy some given criterion.

Similarly, a filter on a set contains those subsets that are sufficiently large to contain some given .

The above interpretations explain conditions 1 and 3 in the section General definition: Clearly the empty set is not "large enough", and clearly the collection of "large enough" things should be "upward-closed". However, they do not really, without elaboration, explain condition 2 of the general definition. For, why should two "large enough" things contain a  "large enough" thing?

2. Alternatively, a filter can be viewed as a "locating scheme": When trying to locate something (a point or a subset) in the space  call a filter the collection of subsets of  that might contain "what is looked for". Then this "filter" should possess the following natural structure:
A locating scheme must be non-empty in order to be of any use at all.
If two subsets,  and  both might contain "what is looked for", then so might their intersection. Thus the filter should be closed with respect to finite intersection.
If a set  might contain "what is looked for", so does every superset of it. Thus the filter is upward-closed.

An ultrafilter can be viewed as a "perfect locating scheme" where  subset  of the space  can be used in deciding whether "what is looked for" might lie in 

From this interpretation, compactness (see the mathematical characterization below) can be viewed as the property that "no location scheme can end up with nothing", or, to put it another way, "always something will be found".

The mathematical notion of filter provides a precise language to treat these situations in a rigorous and general way, which is useful in analysis, general topology and logic.

3. A common use for a filter is to define properties that are satisfied by "almost all" elements of some topological space  The entire space  definitely contains almost-all elements in it; if some  contains almost all elements of  then any superset of it definitely does; and if two subsets,  and  contain almost-all elements of  then so does their intersection.

General definition: Filter on a partially ordered set

  is non-empty.
  is downward directed: For every  there is some  such that  and 
  is an upper set or upward-closed: For every  and   implies that 
 is said to be a  if in addition  is not equal to the whole set  
Depending on the author, the term filter is either a synonym of order filter or else it refers to a  order filter. This article uses the term filter to mean order filter.

While the above definition is the most general way to define a filter for arbitrary posets, it was originally defined for lattices only. In this case, the above definition can be characterized by the following equivalent statement: 
A subset  of a lattice  is a filter, if and only if it is a non-empty upper set that is closed under finite infima (or meets), that is, for all  it is also the case that  

Because of this duality, the discussion of filters usually boils down to the discussion of ideals.
Hence, most additional information on this topic (including the definition of maximal filters and prime filters) is to be found in the article on ideals.
There is a separate article on ultrafilters.

Filter on a set

Definition of a filter

One definition defines "filter" as a synonym of "dual ideal" while the other defines "filter" to mean a dual ideal that is also .

Warning: It is recommended that readers always check how "filter" is defined when reading mathematical literature.

 is closed under finite intersections: If  then so is their intersection.
 This property implies that if  then  has the finite intersection property.
 is upward closed/isotone: If  and  then  for all subsets  
 This property entails that  (since  is  a non-empty subset of ).

Given a set  a canonical partial ordering  can be defined on the powerset  by subset inclusion, turning  into a lattice. 
A "dual ideal" is just a filter with respect to this partial ordering. 

A filter on a set may be thought of as representing a "collection of large subsets".

Filter definitions

The article uses the following definition of "filter on a set".

The other definition of "filter on a set" is the original definition of a "filter" given by Henri Cartan, which required that a filter on a set be a dual ideal that does  contain the empty set.

Note: This article does  require that a filter be proper.

Much mathematical literature, especially that related to topology, defines "filter" to mean a  dual ideal.

Filter bases, subbases, and comparison

Filter bases and subbases

If the empty set is not a member of  we say  is a proper filter base.

Every filter is also a filter base, so the process of passing from filter base to filter may be viewed as a sort of completion.

For every subset  of  there is a smallest (possibly non-proper) filter  containing  called the filter generated or spanned by 

Finer/equivalent filter bases

If also  is finer than  one says that they are equivalent filter bases. 

Examples

See the image at the top of this article for a simple example of filters on a finite set  partially ordered by set inclusion.

A filter in a poset can be created using the Rasiowa–Sikorski lemma, which is often used in forcing. Other filters include club filters and generic filters.

Since all sequences are nets, this holds for sequences as well. 

Let  be a set and  be a non-empty subset of   Then is a filter base.  The filter it generates (that is, the collection of all subsets containing  ) is called the principal filter generated by  
A filter is said to be a free filter if the intersection of all of its members is empty.  A proper principal filter is not free.  Since the intersection of any finite number of members of a filter is also a member, no proper filter on a finite set is free, and indeed is the principal filter generated by the common intersection of all of its members.  A nonprincipal filter on an infinite set is not necessarily free. 
The Fréchet filter on an infinite set  is the set of all subsets of  that have finite complement.
More generally, if  is a measure space for which  the collection of all  such that  forms a filter.

Every uniform structure on a set  is a filter on

Filters in model theory

For every filter  on a set  the set function defined by

is finitely additive — a "measure" if that term is construed rather loosely.  Therefore, the statement

can be considered somewhat analogous to the statement that  holds "almost everywhere". 
That interpretation of membership in a filter is used (for motivation, although it is not needed for actual ) in the theory of ultraproducts in model theory, a branch of mathematical logic.

Filters in topology

In topology and analysis, filters are used to define convergence in a manner similar to the role of sequences in a metric space. 
Both nets and filters provide very general contexts to unify the various notions of limit to arbitrary topological spaces. 
A sequence is usually indexed by the natural numbers  which are a totally ordered set. Nets generalize the notion of a sequence by requiring the index set simply be a directed set. If working only with certain categories of topological spaces, such as first-countable spaces for instance, sequences suffice to characterize most topological properties, but this is not true in general. However, filters (as well as nets) do always suffice to characterize most topological properties.

Neighbourhood bases

Let  be the neighbourhood filter at point  in a topological space  This means that  is the set of all topological neighbourhoods of  the point  It can be verified that  is a filter. A neighbourhood system is another name for a neighbourhood filter. 

Convergent filters and cluster points

We say that a filter base  converges to a point  written  if the neighbourhood filter  is contained in the filter  generated by  that is, if  is finer than  In particular, a filter  (which is a filter base that generates itself) converges to  if 
Explicitly, to say that a filter base  converges to  means that for every neighbourhood  of  there is a  such that 

However, every cluster point of an filter is a limit point. 

By definition, every neighbourhood base  at a given point  generates  so  converges to  If  is a filter base on  then  if  is finer than any neighbourhood base at  For the neighborhood filter at that point, the converse holds as well: any basis of a convergent filter refines the neighborhood filter.

See also

Notes

References

 Nicolas Bourbaki, General Topology (Topologie Générale),  (Ch. 1-4): Provides a good reference for filters in general topology (Chapter I) and for Cauchy filters in uniform spaces (Chapter II)
  
 
 
  
  
 
  
  
  (Provides an introductory review of filters in topology and in metric spaces.)
  
  (Provides an introductory review of filters in topology.)''

Further reading

  

General topology
Order theory